Rovers may refer to:

Sports
 Rovers Cup

Association football teams
 A.F.C. Kempston Rovers, a football club based in Kempston, Bedfordshire, England
 Albion Rovers F.C. (Newport), Wales
 Albion Rovers F.C., Coatbridge, Scotland
 Blackburn Rovers F.C., England
 Blackpool Wren Rovers F.C., Lancashire, England
 Boston Rovers, a United States soccer team that competed in the United Soccer Association league in 1967
 Bristol Rovers F.C., England
 Doncaster Rovers F.C., England
 Fall River Rovers, a United States soccer club, based in Fall River, Massachusetts
 Forest Green Rovers F.C., Gloucestershire, England
 Nyenye Rovers FC, Lesotho
 Paulton Rovers F.C., near Bristol, England
 Raith Rovers F.C., Kirkcaldy, Scotland
 River City Rovers, Louisville, Kentucky, United States
 Rochedale Rovers Football Club, Queensland, Australia
 Roma Rovers FC, Lesotho
 Rovers FC (Guam)
 Shamrock Rovers F.C., Dublin, Ireland
 Sligo Rovers F.C., Sligo, Ireland
 Tampines Rovers FC, Singapore
 Taringa Rovers Soccer Football Club, Brisbane, Australia
 Tranmere Rovers F.C., Birkenhead, England
 Welton Rovers F.C., Somerset, England

Rugby league teams
 Featherstone Rovers, a rugby league club in Featherstone, United Kingdom
 Hull Kingston Rovers, a rugby league club in Kingston upon Hull, United Kingdom
 Richmond Rovers, a rugby league club based in Grey Lynn, New Zealand

Other football teams
 Ilen Rovers, a Gaelic football club in County Cork, Ireland
 Valley Rovers, a hurling club in County Cork, Ireland

Other
 Rovers (Australia), the fifth and final youth section of Scouts Australia
 Rovers (TV series)
 The Rovers (TV series)
 Radio Rovers, the official radio station of the English Championship football side Blackburn Rovers FC

See also 
 Rover (disambiguation)
 Rovers Football Club (disambiguation)